Antal van der Duim and Boy Westerhof are the two-time defending champions. van der Duim elected not to play and Westerhof paired up with Matwe Middelkoop. Westerhof and Middelkoop won the title defeating Martin Fischer & Jesse Huta Galung in the final 6–4, 3–6, [10–6].

Seeds

Draw

References

Sport 1 Open - Doubles
2014 Doubles